Crocus rujanensis  is a species of flowering plant in the genus Crocus of the family Iridaceae. It is a cormous perennial native from southern Serbia to northern Macedonia.

References

rujanensis